Mykola Kovtalyuk (born 26 April 1995) is a Ukrainian professional footballer who plays as a forward for Shakhter Karagandy.

Career
Kovtalyuk is a product of the Knyazha Shchaslyve and UFK-Karpaty Lviv academies.

In February 2019, Kovtalyuk moved to South Korea, signing with Anyang. On 4 March 2021, he signed for FC Akzhayik.

References

External links
Profile at Official FFU Site (Ukr)

1995 births
Living people
People from Sambir
Ukrainian footballers
Ukrainian expatriate footballers
FC Poltava players
FC Arsenal Kyiv players
MFK Zemplín Michalovce players
FC Kolos Kovalivka players
FC Kolkheti-1913 Poti players
FC Dinamo Tbilisi players
FC Dila Gori players
FC Anyang players
FC Akzhayik players
Erovnuli Liga players
K League 2 players
Expatriate footballers in Georgia (country)
Ukrainian expatriate sportspeople in Georgia (country)
Expatriate footballers in Slovakia
Ukrainian expatriate sportspeople in Slovakia
Expatriate footballers in South Korea
Ukrainian expatriate sportspeople in South Korea
Expatriate footballers in Kazakhstan
Ukrainian expatriate sportspeople in Kazakhstan
Association football forwards
Ukrainian First League players
Ukrainian Second League players
Sportspeople from Lviv Oblast